Marty Rea is an Irish actor.

He has won three Irish Times Theatre awards. In 1999 he received a Lady Rothermere Scholarship to the Royal Academy of Dramatic Art (Rada) in London. He was awarded the Best Actor at the Irish Times Theatre Award for Hamlet in 2011; Tom Murphy's Whistle in the Dark in 2013 and for his Richard II (Druid Shakespeare) performance in 2016. In 2018 he won Best Supporting Actor gong for his role as Nick Carraway in the Gate Theatre production of The Great Gatsby, as well for his role as Jemmy Maguire in Druid Theatre Company’s production of King of the Castle by Eugene McCabe.

References

Irish male stage actors
Living people
Year of birth missing (living people)
21st-century Irish male actors